The Interactive Fiction Competition (also known as IFComp) is one of several annual competitions for works of interactive fiction. It has been held since 1995. It is intended for fairly short games, as judges are only allowed to spend two hours playing a game before deciding how many points to award it. The competition has been described as the "Super Bowl" of interactive fiction.

Since 2016 it is operated by the Interactive Fiction Technology Foundation (IFTF).

Organization 
In 2016, operation of the competition was taken over by the Interactive Fiction Technology Foundation.

The lead organizer 2014-2017 was Jason McIntosh, and in 2018 it was Jacqueline Ashwell.

Categories 
Although the first competition had separate sections for Inform and TADS games, subsequent competitions have not been divided into sections and are open to games produced by any method, provided that the software used to play the game is freely available.

In addition to the main competition, the entries take part in the Miss Congeniality contest, where the participating authors vote for three games (not including their own). This was started in 1998 to distribute that year's surplus prizes; this additional contest has remained unchanged since then, even without the original reason for its existence.

There is also a 'Golden Banana of Discord' side contest; the distinction is given to the entry with scores with the highest standard deviation.

Eligibility 
The competition differs from the XYZZY Awards, as authors must specifically submit games to the Interactive Fiction Competition, but all games released in the past year are eligible for the XYZZY Awards. Many games win awards in both competitions.

Judging 
Anyone can judge the games. Because anyone can judge and participate in the competition, there is a rule that "All entries must cost nothing for judges to play".

Rules 
The competition have rules for judges, authors and everyone to ensure that everyone agree on the purpose, scope, and spirit of the competition.

Prizes 
Anyone can donate a prize. Almost always, there are enough prizes donated that anyone who enters will get one.

Winners 
The following is a list of first place winners to date:

1995: Tie: A Change in the Weather by Andrew Plotkin, Uncle Zebulon's Will by Magnus Olsson
1996: The Meteor, the Stone and a Long Glass of Sherbet by Graham Nelson
1997: The Edifice by Lucian P. Smith
1998: Photopia by Adam Cadre
1999: Winter Wonderland by Laura A. Knauth
2000: Kaged by Ian Finley
2001: All Roads by Jon Ingold
2002: Another Earth, Another Sky by Paul O'Brian
2003: Slouching Towards Bedlam by Star Foster and Daniel Ravipinto
2004: Luminous Horizon by Paul O'Brian
2005: Vespers by Jason Devlin
2006: Floatpoint by Emily Short
2007: Lost Pig by Admiral Jota (writing as Grunk)
2008: Violet by Jeremy Freese
2009: Rover's Day Out by Jack Welch and Ben Collins-Sussman
2010: Aotearoa by Matt Wigdahl
2011: Taco Fiction by Ryan Veeder
2012: Andromeda Apocalypse by Marco Innocenti
2013: Coloratura by Lynnea Glasser
2014: Hunger Daemon by Sean M. Shore
2015: Brain Guzzlers from Beyond! by Steph Cherrywell
2016: Detectiveland by Robin Johnson
2017: The Wizard Sniffer by Buster Hudson
2018: Alias "The Magpie" by J. J. Guest
2019: Zozzled by Steph Cherrywell
2020: The Impossible Bottle by Linus Åkesson and Tavern Crawler by Josh Labelle (tie)
2021: And Then You Come to a House Not Unlike the Previous One by B.J. Best
2022: The Grown-Up Detective Agency by Brendan Patrick Hennessy

Only two competitors have won more than once: Paul O'Brian, winning in 2002 and 2004, and Steph Cherrywell, winning in 2015 and 2019.

Reception 
A reviewer for The A.V. Club said of the 2008 competition, "Once again, the IF Competition delivers some of the best writing in games." The 2008 competition was described as containing "some real standouts both in quality of puzzles and a willingness to stretch the definition of text adventures/interactive fiction."

See also
Spring Thing
XYZZY Awards

References

External links
 Official website

Interactive fiction
Video game development competitions
Writing contests